Cythara thetis is a species of sea snail, a marine gastropod mollusk in the family Mangeliidae.

This species is considered a nomen dubium.

Description

Distribution
This marine species was found off Port Alfred, South Africa.

References

 Turton, William Harry. The marine shells of Port Alfred, S. Africa. H. Milford, Oxford University Press, 1932.

External links
  Tucker, J.K. 2004 Catalog of recent and fossil turrids (Mollusca: Gastropoda). Zootaxa 682: 1–1295.

Endemic fauna of South Africa
thetis
Gastropods described in 1932